Lake Manitoba is the 14th largest lake in Canada and the 33rd largest lake in the world with a total area of .

History
The lake, its shores populated by the Assiniboine and Cree, was made known to Europeans by La Vérendrye in the mid-1730s. He and his sons travelled from Fort La Reine through this lake to explore the Saskatchewan River and its environs. Forts were established on both the Saskatchewan and Cedar Lake. It also was part of the fur trade route to Hudson Bay.

The name derives from Cree manitou-wapow or Ojibwa manidoobaa, both meaning "straits of Manitou, the Great Spirit", a toponym referring to what are now called The Narrows in the centre of the lake. These narrows were an area that the spirit could be heard. What exactly was heard, and in what exact location, seems to be a mystery. The lake was known to French explorers as Lac des Prairies.

The short-lived Republic of Manitobah and its successor the province of Manitoba both take their name from this lake.

Manipogo 
For many years there have been claims that a monster similar to Scotland's Loch Ness Monster and British Columbia's Ogopogo lives in the lake. It has been named Manipogo. Sightings of this serpent like sea monster have been going on since roughly 1908.

Geography

The lake is subdivided into two connected but distinctly different basins: a small, irregular-shaped north basin and a much larger south basin. It is part of the watershed of the Nelson River and Hudson Bay.

Communities on the lake include Fairford, Steep Rock, St. Laurent, and Sandy Bay.

Tributaries and outflows 
Lake Manitoba drains northeast into Lake Winnipeg through the Fairford River to Lake St. Martin and then to the Dauphin River. Most of the water inflow is from the Waterhen River (42% of the inflow) and from precipitation directly on the lake's surface (40%), while nearly 50% of the outflow is by evaporation. This explains its hyposaline nature.

Water control dam 
Severe flooding around the lake led to the excavation of an improved outlet channel between 1899 and 1901. In 1933 following dry years in the late 1920s and early 1930s, the Province constructed a concrete control dam across the Fairford River immediately downstream of the channel. A new dam was constructed in 1961.

Flood in 2011 
On May 31, 2011 when the lake was already very high, strong winds from the north and the north-west of  gusting to  caused major damage to beaches and communities on the south basin of the lake including Twin Lakes Beach, St. Laurent, St. Ambroise, Delta Beach, Lynch Point, Big Point, and large areas of farmland.

Historical floods
Unlike a river which can rise and recede relatively quickly, large lakes like Lake Manitoba require months or even years for lake levels to rise and fall. Below are the flood years on record in which Lake Manitoba was above flood stage, as defined by Manitoba Infrastructure and Transportation (MIT), of  ASL. However, beginning around a level of  ASL, localized flooding of agricultural land around the lake can occur.

In 1881-82 lake levels were not recorded. However, given the topography around Lake Manitoba, a level of  ASL would be required to cause the lake to drain back into the Assiniboine River, which occurred in both 1881 and 1882. Based on a rating curve for flows on the Fairford River during this period, the flows correlate with a lake level as high as  ASL.
Lake Levels did not begin to be recorded until 1914.
On May 31, 2011, during a major wind event, Lake Manitoba was measured at  ASL at Twin Lakes Beach. As a result of the high water level with wind set-up and wave action, significant damage occurred along the south basin of Lake Manitoba. The 2011 peak flood level is the wind-eliminated peak lake level.

Fishing
Lake Manitoba is one of the three main lakes in Manitoba's $30-million annual commercial fishing industry.

The main marketable fish species caught on Lake Manitoba has changed from whitefish in the late 19th century to walleye, sauger and yellow perch today. There has been a large increase in rough fish like carp. Tullibee catch remains high, although it is not considered a commercial species.

Gallery

See also 
List of lakes of Manitoba

References

External links

Modern sedimentology and hydrology of Lake Manitoba
Lake Manitoba Stewardship Board

Lakes of Manitoba
Hudson's Bay Company trading posts